Alfred Berglund Sr. (December 17, 1871 – November 20, 1962) was an American farmer and politician.

Early life 
Berglund was born on a farm in Albert Lea, Minnesota, and attended the Albert Lea public schools.

Career 
Berglund lived with his wife and family in Albert Lea, Minnesota and was a farmer. Berglund served in the Minnesota Senate from 1935 to 1946. He later worked as director of the Freeborn County Historical Society.

References

1871 births
1962 deaths
People from Albert Lea, Minnesota
Farmers from Minnesota
Minnesota state senators

People from Freeborn County, Minnesota